Saxe-Eisenach was an Ernestine duchy ruled by the Saxon House of Wettin. The state intermittently existed at three different times in the Thuringian region of the Holy Roman Empire. The chief town and capital of all three duchies was Eisenach.

History
In the 15th century, much of what is now the German state of Thuringia, including the area around Eisenach, was in the hands of the Wettin dynasty, since 1423 Prince-electors of Saxony. In 1485, the Wettin lands were divided according to the Treaty of Leipzig, with most of the Thuringian lands going to Elector Ernest of Saxony and his descendants. The Ernestine Wettins also retained the title of Elector. However, when Ernest's grandson John Frederick the Magnanimous revolted against Emperor Charles V during the Schmalkaldic War, he was defeated at the 1547 Battle of Mühlberg and deprived of the electorate in favour of his Wettin cousin Maurice. According to the Capitulation of Wittenberg he was only allowed to retain the lands in Thuringia.

Ernestine duchies
After John Frederick's son Duke John Frederick II in 1566 had been banned by Emperor Maximilian II due to his involvement in the Grumbach feuds, the Ernestine duchy was at first ruled by his younger brother John William. According to the 1572 Division of Erfurt, he partitioned the lands among himself and his minor nephews, the sons of John Frederick II: He himself retained the Duchy of Saxe-Weimar, while the Duchy of Saxe-Coburg-Eisenach passed to John Casimir and John Ernest, under the regency of their cousin Elector Augustus of Saxony.

For the next three centuries the Ernestine lands were divided whenever the dukes had more than one son to provide for, and re-combined when they died without direct heirs, but all of the lands stayed in the Ernestine branch of the Wettin family. All descendants of John Frederick the Magnanimous in the male line bore the title "Duke of Saxony", whether or not they actually ruled any territory. Brothers sometimes ruled jointly, but usually there was a division of territory if there was more than one son to inherit. As a result, the Duchy of Saxe-Eisenach was separated from and subsumed into other Ernestine duchies several times. The actual territories included in the duchy changed with each creation, but always with the town of Eisenach as the core.

Duchies of Saxe-Eisenach
The first Duchy of Saxe-Eisenach was created in 1596, after the banned Duke John Frederick II had died in captivity and his surviving sons had come of age. Their Duchy of Saxe-Coburg-Eisenach was split, whereby the younger John Ernest became Duke at Eisenach, while the elder John Casimir took his residence at Coburg. When in 1633 Duke John Casimir died without issue, the Wettin line in Saxe-Coburg died out, and John Ernest inherited it. Nevertheless, he himself also died heirless in 1638, and his territories were split between Saxe-Weimar and Saxe-Altenburg, which had itself been separated from Saxe-Weimar in 1603. 

In the course of the partition of the Saxe-Weimar lands among the sons of late Duke John II in 1640, the eldest brother William of Saxe-Weimar gave the re-established Duchy of Saxe-Eisenach to his younger brother Albert IV, while the youngest Ernest received the Duchy of Saxe-Gotha. However, Duke Albert died without heirs in 1644, and Saxe-Eisenach was then divided between Saxe-Gotha and Saxe-Weimar, ruled by his brothers.

For nearly 20 years the residence of Eisenach was part of Saxe-Weimar. However, when Duke Wilhelm of Saxe-Weimar died in 1662, he left four children: John Ernest, Adolf William, John George and Bernard. The second eldest, Adolf William, received Eisenach. He had to share this, however, with his younger brother John George, who finally accepted the receipt of an income from the duchy of Saxe-Eisenach and made his residence in the small town of Marksuhl. Adolf William had five sons, but the first four died soon after birth. In 1668 he died, just before of the birth of his fifth son, Willam Augustus, who became the new Duke of Saxe-Eisenach from his birth, under the guardianship of his uncle John George. A sickly boy, he died in 1671 at only two years old, and John George became Duke of Saxe-Eisenach.

Saxe-Eisenach assumed its final shape in 1672, following the death of Frederick William III of Saxe-Altenburg and the partition of his lands. The line of Johann Georg I ruled Saxe-Eisenach for 69 years, until Duke Wilhelm Heinrich died heirless in 1741. Duke Ernest Augustus I of Saxe-Weimar, Wilhelm's second cousin, inherited Saxe-Eisenach; he and his successors ruled Saxe-Weimar and Saxe-Eisenach in personal union until 1809, when the duchies were formally merged into the Duchy of Saxe-Weimar-Eisenach.

Dukes of Saxe-Eisenach

First creation 
Created in 1572 as Saxe-Coburg-Eisenach
1596 divided into Saxe-Coburg and Saxe-Eisenach
 John Ernest (1596–1638), left no issue
Divided between Saxe-Altenburg and Saxe-Weimar

Second creation 
 Albrecht (1640–1644), left no issue
Divided between Saxe-Gotha and Saxe-Weimar

Third creation 
 Adolf Wilhelm (1662–68), second son of Duke William of Saxe-Weimar
 William Augustus (1668–71), minor son, left no issue
 John George I (1671–86), third son of Duke William of Saxe-Weimar
 John George II (1686–98), son, left no issue
 John William (1698–1729), younger brother
 William Henry (1729–41), son, left no issue
Line extinct

Personal union with Saxe-Weimar 
 Ernst August I (1741-1748), Duke of Saxe-Weimar since 1728
 Ernst August II (1748-1758), son
 Charles Augustus (1758-1809), son
Merged with Saxe-Weimar into Saxe-Weimar-Eisenach

References	
 Much of the content of this article comes from Sachsen-Eisenach on the German Wikipedia and Ducado de Sajonia-Eisenach on the Spanish Wikipedia, both retrieved November 10, 2005.

External links
 German genealogies

States of the Confederation of the Rhine
States and territories established in 1640
States and territories established in 1672
Eisenach
 
House of Wettin
1596 establishments in the Holy Roman Empire
1638 disestablishments in the Holy Roman Empire
1640 establishments in the Holy Roman Empire
1644 disestablishments in the Holy Roman Empire
1662 establishments in the Holy Roman Empire
1809 disestablishments in Europe